Philip Currie may refer to:

Philip Currie, 1st Baron Currie (1834–1906), British diplomat
Philip J. Currie (born 1949), Canadian palaeontologist